Chinese swordsmanship encompasses a variety of sword fighting styles native to China. No Chinese system teaches swordsmanship exclusively (as is the case with modern sports such as  fencing or kendo), but many eclectic schools of Chinese martial arts include instruction for using one or two-handed versions of the single-edged sword (dao) and the double-edged sword (jian).

Many Chinese martial arts styles teach swordsmanship. 
Wudang Sword is an umbrella term for all sword styles taught in the Wudang chuan family of martial arts. Taijijian is the swordsmanship taught within Taijiquan.

Shuangdao is the Chinese term for the wielding of two dao simultaneously.

See also
Butterfly sword
Nandao
Eighteen Arms of Wushu
Japanese swordsmanship
Korean swordsmanship
French school of fencing
German school of fencing
Italian school of fencing

Sources
Zhang Yun, The Complete Taiji Dao: The Art of the Chinese Saber, Blue Snake Books, 
Zhang Yun, Art Of Chinese Swordsmanship: Manual Of Taiji Jian, Weatherhill,